Delli may refer to:
 Delli-ye Cheman
 Delli-ye Mohsaleh Aqa
 Delli-ye Solmavand
Karima Delli (born 1979), French politician

See also
 Delhi
 Dili